Kern Point is a 12,763-foot-elevation (3,890 meter) mountain summit located west of the crest of the Sierra Nevada mountain range in Tulare County, California. It is situated in Sequoia National Park, two miles northeast of Picket Guard Peak, and seven miles east of Mount Whitney. Kern Point is the southernmost peak on Kern Ridge, and precipitation runoff from this mountain drains to the Kern River. The river was named by John C. Frémont for Edward Kern, the artist and topographer of Frémont's third expedition in 1845. The Kern Point toponym was officially adopted in 1928 by the U.S. Board on Geographic Names.

Climbing
The first ascent of the summit was made July 25, 1924, by William Horsfall and C. Laughlin. Inclusion on the Sierra Peaks Section peakbagging list generates climbing interest in this remote peak.

Climate
According to the Köppen climate classification system, Kern Point is located in an alpine climate zone. Most weather fronts originate in the Pacific Ocean, and travel east toward the Sierra Nevada mountains. As fronts approach, they are forced upward by the peaks (orographic lift), causing them to drop their moisture in the form of rain or snowfall onto the range.

See also
 
 Sequoia-Kings Canyon Wilderness

References

External links
 Weather forecast: Kern Point
 Kern Point (photo): Flickr

Mountains of Tulare County, California
Mountains of Sequoia National Park
North American 3000 m summits
Mountains of Northern California
Sierra Nevada (United States)